The 1999 Campeonato Paulista de Futebol Profissional da Primeira Divisão - Série A1 was the 97th season of São Paulo's top professional football league. São Paulo won the championship by the 19th time. Juventus was relegated.

Championship

First phase
The first phase was disputed by all the teams of the championship, except for Corinthians, Palmeiras, Santos and São Paulo, which would participate the Rio-São Paulo tournament at the time and would only enter in the second phase. The teams would be divided in two groups of six teams, and the four best teams in each group would qualify for the second phase, with the others going to the relegation group.

Group 1

Group 2

Relegation Playoffs

Second phase
In the second phase, the 8 qualified teams were joined by the four participants of the Rio-São Paulo tournament. The 12 teams were divided in two groups of six teams, with each team playing twice against the teams of its own group, with the two best teams in each group qualifying to the Semifinals.

Group 3

Group 4

Semifinals

|}

Finals

|}

References

Campeonato Paulista seasons
Paulista